Pico dos Marins  is a mountain peak in Brazil, between the cities of Piquete and Cruzeiro, state of São Paulo.

False state highest point 

For many years, Pico dos Marins was incorrectly considered to be the highest point in the state of São Paulo. This information could be found in many official publications and schoolbooks. Later it was found that several peaks of the more easterly Serra Fina sub-range of the Mantiqueira Mountains were much higher.

The Serra Fina range is still poorly surveyed, and other higher peaks may yet be found.

Still, Pico dos Marins is the highest point of its section of the range and an important landmark, as its detachment from the main Mantiqueira ridge crest allows it to be easily seen and recognized from a vast extension of the densely populated and highly industrialized Paraíba do Sul river valley to its south.

Ascent 

The mountain was first climbed in 1911.

Topography 

The main assembly of the Marins Massif consists of three sharp rocky peaks, all over 2,000 meters above sea level and consisting of hundreds of meters of rocky cliffs. In spite of being the highest of the three, Pico dos Marins is the most accessible to climbers, thanks to its less vertical north face. Deep valleys cut by canyons and tight vegetation cause its neighbors to be much more difficult to climb. North to south, the peaks are named Marins, Maria and Mariana.

Notes

References 

Mountains of Brazil
Landforms of São Paulo (state)